Deh-e Now-e Abdolvand (also Romanized as Deh-e Now-e ‘Abdolvand; also known as Deh Now) is a village in Pachehlak-e Sharqi Rural District, in the Central District of Aligudarz County, Lorestan Province, Iran. At the 2006 census, its population was 171, in 35 families.

References 

Towns and villages in Aligudarz County